is a passenger railway station in located in the city of Kazo, Saitama, Japan, operated by the private railway operator Tōbu Railway.

Lines

Station layout
 
This station consists of two opposed side platforms serving two tracks, connected to the station building by a footbridge.

Platforms

Adjacent stations

History
Shin-Koga Station opened on 21 July 1935.

From 17 March 2012, station numbering was introduced on all Tōbu lines, with Shin-Koga Station becoming "TN-05".

Passenger statistics
In fiscal 2019, the station was used by an average of 1631 passengers daily (boarding passengers only).

Surrounding area
Koga Post Office
Koga History Museum

See also
 List of railway stations in Japan

References

External links

 Shin-Koga Station information 

Railway stations in Saitama Prefecture
Stations of Tobu Railway
Tobu Nikko Line
Railway stations in Japan opened in 1935
Kazo, Saitama